The Foreign Legion is a 1928 American silent adventure film directed by Edward Sloman and starring Norman Kerry, Lewis Stone, and Mary Nolan. The film is based on the 1913 novel The Red Mirage by I.A.R. Wylie.  It was one of several Foreign Legion-themed films produced in the wake of the successful 1926 film Beau Geste. The production cost around $250,000, but was the subject of diplomatic protests from French authorities due to its depiction of brutality.

Cast
 Norman Kerry as Richard Farquhar  
 Lewis Stone as Col. Destin  
 Crauford Kent as Capt. Arnaud  
 Mary Nolan as Sylvia Omney  
 June Marlowe as Gabrielle  
 Walter Perry as Cpl. Gotz

References

Bibliography
 Schatz, Thomas. Hollywood: Social dimensions: technology, regulation and the audience. Taylor & Francis, 2004.

External links

1928 films
1920s adventure comedy films
American adventure comedy films
Films directed by Edward Sloman
American silent feature films
Universal Pictures films
Films about the French Foreign Legion
Films set in Algeria
American black-and-white films
Films based on works by I. A. R. Wylie
1928 comedy films
1920s English-language films
1920s American films
Silent American comedy films
Silent adventure comedy films